Peter A. Feldman (born May 22, 1982) is an American lawyer and currently serves as a member of the U.S. Consumer Product Safety Commission. Feldman was nominated by President Donald J. Trump and confirmed by the U.S. Senate in 2018. Previously, he served as a senior counsel to the Commerce Committee in the U.S. Senate. Feldman is a Republican, and worked as a staffer for various Republican senators.

Early life and education
Feldman was born in Cleveland, Ohio, on May 22, 1982. Feldman attended St. Albans School in Washington, D.C. He then attended Colgate University, graduating with a B.A., cum laude, in 2004. Feldman received his juris doctor, cum laude, from American University’s Washington College of Law in 2010.

Career
Feldman served as a senior counsel to the United States Senate Committee on Commerce, Science, and Transportation from 2011 until he joined the CPSC in 2018. In that role, he served as a key advisor on consumer protection, product safety, data security, and privacy issues to Senator John Thune, chairman of the Senate Commerce Committee, and was instrumental in drafting and negotiating bipartisan legislation and conducting oversight and investigations of the CPSC, the Federal Trade Commission, and private sector firms. Among other things, Feldman has advocated for science and risk-based regulations, agency engagement with stakeholders, and regulatory burden reduction.

Feldman led the commerce committee's efforts on numerous bipartisan legislative initiatives, including the Consumer Review Fairness Act, the Better Online Ticket Sales Act, and the Child Nicotine Poisoning Prevention Act.

As the Senate commerce committee's senior sports attorney, Feldman worked to expand and modernize the United States Anti-Doping Agency, conducted investigations into the U.S. Olympic Committee following the USA Gymnastics sex abuse scandal, and served as lead negotiator on the bipartisan Protecting Young Victims from Sexual Abuse and Safe Sport Authorization Act.

As a staffer for former U.S. Senator Mike DeWine, Feldman worked directly on the Virginia Graeme Baker Pool and Spa Safety Act, a bill that aimed to protect children by reducing suction entrapment accidents in pools.

Feldman's appointment to the CPSC began a Republican majority on the commission.

References

External links 
 
 CPSC biography

Living people
U.S. Consumer Product Safety Commission personnel
Colgate University alumni
Washington College of Law alumni
21st-century American lawyers
Ohio Republicans
Employees of the United States Senate
1982 births
Lawyers from Cleveland
Washington, D.C., Republicans